Gavriel Tsifroni (‎ 1914 – 7 June 2011) was an Israeli journalist.

Biography 
Tsifroni was born in Vilna in 1914. At the age of three he immigrated to Mandate Palestine with his family, which moved to Tel Aviv. From the age of 14 he worked in a bakery delivering bread to the residents of the town. At the age of 16 he began working as a journalist in the Hebrew newspaper "Hazit HaAm", and later on for the Hebrew newspaper "Do'ar HaYom". He worked as a reporter of the "Daily Telegraph" and the "HaTzofe". In 1935, he began working for the Hebrew newspaper "HaBoker", initially as a reporter in Tel Aviv, and afterwards as a branch manager in Jerusalem.

In 1962, Tsifroni was appointed as the editor of the "HaBoker" newspaper, and he served in this position until the newspaper was shut down in 1965.  Between 1969 and 1977, he served as a CEO of the Habima Theatre in Tel Aviv.

Tsifroni was married to Shulamit Tsifroni (1917 - 2008) née Abulafia, and together they had one daughter.

Tsifroni died on June 7, 2011, at age 96.

References 

1914 births
2011 deaths
Lithuanian Jews
Soviet emigrants to Mandatory Palestine
Israeli radio presenters
Israeli journalists
Burials at Yarkon Cemetery